Summer Fling may refer to:
 Summer Fling, a 1996 film also known as The Last of the High Kings
 Summer Fling, a 2003 studio album by the Red Hot Valentines
 "Summer Fling", a song by Mykki Blanco
 "Summer Fling", a song by Nina Nesbitt
 "Summer Fling", a song by Willow Smith
 Summer Fling, an event created by Ontario Young Liberals

See also
 "Summerfling", a song by k.d. lang